Leonard Wilcox (January 29, 1799 – June 18, 1850) was an American lawyer, judge and politician. He served as a United States senator from New Hampshire, as judge of the New Hampshire Superior Court, and as a member of the New Hampshire House of Representatives during the 1800s.

Early life
Born in Hanover, New Hampshire, Wilcox was the son of Jeduthun Wilcox and Sarah (Fisk) Wilcox.  His father was a United States representative from New Hampshire during the 13th and 14th United States Congresses.

He graduated from Dartmouth College in 1817 and was a member of the Phi Beta Kappa Society.  After graduation, he studied law and was admitted to the bar in 1820. He began the practice of law in Orford in Grafton County.

Career
He served as a member of the New Hampshire House of Representatives from 1828-1834, was judge of the New Hampshire Superior Court from 1838-1840, and as bank commissioner from 1838-1842. Appointed by Governor Page as a Democrat to the United States Senate to fill the vacancy caused by the resignation of Franklin Pierce, Wilcox was subsequently elected and served from March 1, 1842 to March 3, 1843. After leaving the Senate, he resumed the practice of law.

He served as judge of the Court of Common Pleas from 1847-1848, and was again appointed judge of the superior court in 1848, serving until his death.

Death
Wilcox died in Orford, Grafton County, New Hampshire, on June 18, 1850 (age 51 years, 140 days). He is interred at West Congregational Churchyard in Orford, New Hampshire.

Personal life
On September 12, 1819, he married Almira Morey, daughter of inventor Samuel Morey.  Following Almira's death, Wilcox married Mary Mann on October 10, 1833. He had children from both marriages.

References

External links
 
 Biographical Directory of the United States Congress
 The Papers of the Wilcox Family at Dartmouth College Library

1799 births
1850 deaths
People from Hanover, New Hampshire
Democratic Party United States senators from New Hampshire
Democratic Party members of the New Hampshire House of Representatives
New Hampshire state court judges
New Hampshire lawyers
Dartmouth College alumni
People from Orford, New Hampshire
19th-century American politicians
19th-century American judges
19th-century American lawyers